Charcot–Marie–Tooth disease (CMT) is a hereditary motor and sensory neuropathy of the peripheral nervous system characterized by progressive loss of muscle tissue and touch sensation across various parts of the body. This disease is the most commonly inherited neurological disorder, affecting about one in 2,500 people. It is named after those who classically described it: the Frenchman Jean-Martin Charcot (1825–1893), his pupil Pierre Marie (1853–1940), and the Briton Howard Henry Tooth (1856–1925).

There is no known cure. Care focuses on maintaining function. CMT was previously classified as a subtype of muscular dystrophy.

Signs and symptoms
Symptoms of CMT usually begin in early childhood or early adulthood but can begin later. Some people do not experience symptoms until their early 30s or 40s. Usually, the initial symptom is foot drop early in the course of the disease. This can also cause hammertoe, where the toes are always curled. Wasting of muscle tissue of the lower parts of the legs may give rise to a "stork leg" or "inverted champagne bottle" appearance. Weakness in the hands and forearms occurs in many people as the disease progresses.

Loss of touch sensation in the feet, ankles, and legs as well as in the hands, wrists, and arms occurs with various types of the disease. Early- and late-onset forms occur with 'on and off' painful spasmodic muscular contractions that can be disabling when the disease activates.  High-arched feet (pes cavus) or flat-arched feet (pes planus) are classically associated with the disorder. Sensory and proprioceptive nerves in the hands and feet are often damaged, while unmyelinated pain nerves are left intact. Overuse of an affected hand or limb can activate symptoms including numbness, spasm, and painful cramping.

Symptoms and progression of the disease can vary. Involuntary grinding of teeth and squinting are prevalent and often go unnoticed by the person affected. Breathing can be affected in some, as can hearing, vision, and neck and shoulder muscles. Scoliosis is common, causing hunching and loss of height. Hip sockets can be malformed. Gastrointestinal problems can be part of CMT, as can difficulty chewing, swallowing, and speaking (due to atrophy of vocal cords). A tremor can develop as muscles waste. Pregnancy has been known to exacerbate CMT, as well as severe emotional stress. Patients with CMT must avoid periods of prolonged immobility such as when recovering from a secondary injury, as prolonged periods of limited mobility can drastically accelerate symptoms of CMT.

Pain due to postural changes, skeletal deformations, muscle fatigue, and cramping is fairly common in people with CMT. It can be mitigated or treated by physical therapies, surgeries, and corrective or assistive devices. Analgesic medications may also be needed if other therapies do not provide relief from pain. Neuropathic pain is often a symptom of CMT, though, like other symptoms of CMT, its presence and severity vary from case to case. For some people, pain can be significant to severe and interfere with daily life activities. However, pain is not experienced by all people with CMT. When neuropathic pain is present as a symptom of CMT, it is comparable to that seen in other peripheral neuropathies, as well as postherpetic neuralgia and complex regional pain syndrome, among other diseases.

Causes

Charcot–Marie–Tooth disease is caused by genetic mutations that cause defects in neuronal proteins. Nerve signals are conducted by an axon with a myelin sheath wrapped around it. Most mutations in CMT affect the myelin sheath, but some affect the axon.

Classification

CMT is a heterogeneous disease and the mutations linked to it may occur in a number of different genes. Based on the affected gene, CMT is categorized into several types and subtypes.

Chromosome 17

The most common cause of CMT (70–80% of the cases) is the duplication of a large region on the short arm of chromosome 17 that includes the gene PMP22.

Some mutations affect the gene MFN2, on chromosome 1, which codes for a mitochondrial protein. Mutated MFN2 causes the mitochondria to form large clusters, or clots, which are unable to travel down the axon towards the synapses. This prevents the synapses from functioning.

X-linked CMT and Schwann cells

CMT can also be produced by X-linked mutations and is named X-linked CMT (CMTX). In CMTX, mutated connexons create nonfunctional gap junctions that interrupt molecular exchange and signal transport.

The mutation can appear in GJB1 coding for connexin 32, a gap junction protein expressed in Schwann cells. Because this protein is also present in oligodendrocytes, demyelination can appear in the CNS.

Schwann cells create the myelin sheath, by wrapping its plasma membrane around the axon.

Neurons, Schwann cells, and fibroblasts work together to create a functional nerve. Schwann cells and neurons exchange molecular signals by gap junctions that regulate survival and differentiation.

Demyelinating Schwann cells causes abnormal axon structure and function. They may cause axon degeneration, or they may simply cause axons to malfunction.

The myelin sheath allows nerve cells to conduct signals faster. When the myelin sheath is damaged, nerve signals are slower, and this can be measured by a common neurological test, electromyography. When the axon is damaged, though, this results in a reduced compound muscle action potential.

GARS1-Related Axonal Neuropathy

CMT2 types are typically referred to as axonal neuropathies due to the axonal degeneration observed. CMT2 types are a result of damage to the nerve axons rather than damage to the myelin sheath (as is the case with CMT1). Damaged axons cause slowed transmission of signals to the muscles and brain, causing symptoms including muscle atrophy, weakness, decreased sensitivity, and foot deformity. Symptoms of CMT2 types typically appear between the ages of 5 and 25. CMT2D is one of 31 Charcot-Marie-Tooth type 2 forms 1 and is only diagnosed if sensory deficits (such as loss of sensation due to the degradation of sensory axons) are observed along with motor deficits; otherwise, distal hereditary motor neuropathy type V is diagnosed. It is unknown why sensory involvement is so varied between GARS1 neuropathy patients. Symptoms of CMT2D include foot deformity, muscle weakness and cramping, compromised reflexes, loss of sensation, and muscle atrophy and are similar to the symptoms of other both CMT1 and CMT2 types. Symptoms and severity vary from patient to patient.

Mice are often used to model CMT2D and typically demonstrate aberrant neuromuscular function at the neuromuscular junction (NMJ). The neuromuscular junction is abnormal in CMT2D mice, with subjects showing neuromuscular junction degeneration in hind muscles. The dorsal root ganglia (DRG) is also affected via aberrant sensory neuron fate, meaning that sensory neuron cell fates are abnormally determined. CMT2D mice have fewer proprioceptive and mechanosensitive neurons, but have more nociceptive neurons, possibly due to mutant GlyRS aberrantly interacting with the extracellular region of tropomyosin receptor kinase, or Trk, receptors.  Trk receptors are crucial to the survival and development of sensory neurons; when disrupted, nerve development and survival is disrupted as well, possibly leading to the abnormal sensory neuron counts observed in CMT2D mice.

CMT2D is a result of autosomal dominant mutations in the human GARS1 gene located at 7p14.3  and is thought to be caused by aberrant gain-of-function missense mutations. The GARS1 gene is a protein-coding gene responsible for the encoding of glycyl-tRNA synthetase (GlyRS). Glycyl-tRNA synthetase is a class II aminoacyl-tRNA synthetase and acts as the catalyst for the synthesis of glycyl-tRNA by covalently bonding amino acids with their corresponding cognate tRNAs for protein translation. Glycyl-tRNA is integral to protein translation and attaches glycine to its cognate RNA.

Many different mutations have been found in CMT2D patients and it remains unclear how mutations in GARS1 cause CMT2D. However, it is thought that mutant glycyl-tRNA synthetase (GlyRS) interferes with transmembrane receptors, causing motor disease and that mutations in the gene could disrupt the ability of GlyRS to interact with its cognate RNA, disrupting protein production. The GARS1 mutations present in CMT2D cause a deficient amount of glycyl-tRNA in cells, preventing the elongation phase of protein synthesis. Because elongation is a key step in protein production, ribosomes are unable to continue protein synthesis at glycine sites. GARS1 mutations also stall initiation of translation. Glycine addition failure causes a stress response that further stalls protein production, preventing initiation of translation. By stalling elongation and initiation of translation, CMT2D mutations in the GARS1 gene cause translational repression, meaning that overall translation is inhibited.

GARS1-associated axonal neuropathy is progressive, meaning that it worsens over time. Unknown mechanisms are thought to cause the chronic neurodegeneration resulting from the aberrant GlyRS; however, one theory for disease is VEGF-deficiency. Mutant GlysRS interferes with neuronal transmembrane receptors, including neuropilin 1 (Nrp1) and vascular endothelial growth factor (VEGF), causing neuropathy. GARS-CMT2D mutations alter GlyRS and allow it to bind to the Nrp1 receptor, interfering with the normal binding of Nrp1 to VEGF. While enhanced expression of VEGF improves motor function, reduced expression of Nrp1 worsens CMT2D; because Nrp1 binds to mutant GlyRS in mutant GARS1-CMT2D individuals, Nrp1 expression is reduced, in turn worsening motor function. Mice with deficient VEGF demonstrate motor-neuron disease over time. Thus, the VEGF/Nrp1 pathway is considered to be targetable for CMT2D treatment.

Diagnosis
CMT can be diagnosed through three different forms of tests: measurement of the speed of nerve impulses (nerve conduction studies), a biopsy of the nerve, and DNA testing. DNA testing can give a definitive diagnosis, but not all the genetic markers for CMT are known.  CMT is first most noticed when someone develops lower leg weakness, such as foot drop, or foot deformities, including hammertoes and high arches, but signs alone do not lead to diagnosis.  Patients must be referred to a physician specialising in neurology or rehabilitation medicine. To see signs of muscle weakness, the neurologist may ask patients to walk on their heels or to move part of their leg against an opposing force.  To identify sensory loss, the neurologist tests for deep-tendon reflexes, such as the knee jerk, which are reduced or absent in CMT. The doctor may also ask the patient's family history since CMT is hereditary.  The lack of family history does not rule out CMT, but is helpful to rule out other causes of neuropathy, such as diabetes or exposure to certain chemicals or drugs.

In 2010, CMT was one of the first diseases where the genetic cause of a particular patient's disease was precisely determined by sequencing the whole genome of an affected individual.  This was done by the scientists employed by the Charcot Marie Tooth Association (CMTA). Two mutations were identified in a gene, SH3TC2, known to cause CMT.  Researchers then compared the affected patient's genome to the genomes of the patient's mother, father, and seven siblings with and without the disease. The mother and father each had one normal and one mutant copy of this gene, and had mild or no symptoms. The offspring who inherited two mutant genes presented fully with the disease.

Histology

The constant cycle of demyelination and remyelination, which occurs in CMT, can lead to the formation of layers of myelin around some nerves, termed an "onion bulb".  These are also seen in chronic inflammatory demyelinating polyneuropathy.  Muscles show fiber type grouping, a similarly nonspecific finding that indicates a cycle of denervation/reinnervation.  Normally, type I and type II muscle fibers show a checkerboard-like random distribution.  However, when reinnervation occurs, the group of fibers associated with one nerve are of the same type.  The standard for indicating fiber type is histoenzymatic adenosine triphosphatase (ATPase at pH 9.4).

Management
Often, the most important goal for patients with CMT is to maintain movement, muscle strength, and flexibility. Therefore, an interprofessional team approach with occupational therapy (OT), physical therapy (PT), orthotist, podiatrist, and or orthopedic surgeon is recommended. PT typically focuses on muscle-strength training, muscle stretching, and aerobic exercise, while OT can provide education on energy conservation strategies and activities of daily living. Physical therapy should be involved in designing an exercise program that fits a person's personal strengths and flexibility. Bracing can also be used to correct problems caused by CMT. An orthotist may address gait abnormalities by prescribing the use of orthotics.

Appropriate footwear is also very important for people with CMT, but they often have difficulty finding well-fitting shoes because of their high-arched feet and hammertoes. Due to the lack of good sensory reception in the feet, CMT patients may also need to see a podiatrist for assistance in trimming nails or removing calluses that develop on the pads of the feet. Lastly, patients can also decide to have surgery performed by a podiatrist or an orthopedic surgeon. Surgery may help to stabilize the patients' feet or correct progressive problems. These procedures include straightening and pinning the toes, lowering the arch, and sometimes, fusing the ankle joint to provide stability. CMT patients must take extra care to avoid falling as fractures take longer to heal in someone with an underlying disease process. Additionally, the resulting inactivity may cause the CMT to worsen. The Charcot–Marie–Tooth Association classifies the chemotherapy drug vincristine as a "definite high risk" and states, "vincristine has been proven hazardous and should be avoided by all CMT patients, including those with no symptoms." Several corrective surgical procedures  can be done to improve the physical condition of the affected individuals.

Orthotics 

If the muscles of the lower extremities are weak, it makes sense to prescribe custom-fabricated orthotics. Depending on which muscle groups are affected, the correct orthoses with appropriate functional elements should be prescribed. A weakness of the Musculus tibialis anterior, which lifts the feet, is usually accompanied by an atrophy of the Musculus gastrocnemius which, together with the Musculus soleus, forms the Musculus triceps surae (distal calf muscles), occurs causing the known "stork leg deformity". In most cases, ankle-foot orthoses that have functional elements for the foot lifting and adjustable control of the lowering of the forefoot make sense. Weak calf muscles lead to insufficient activation of the forefoot lever. This leads to an additional increasing uncertainty when standing and walking. If the calf muscles are weak, an orthosis should therefore be equipped with functional elements to activate the forefoot lever. An orthotic joint with an adjustable dynamic dorsiflexion stop with strong spring in combination with a lower leg shell in front of the shin is recommended for this. Such orthoses help to control foot drop, instability of the foot and ankle and offer the patient a better sense of balance when standing and walking without restricting mobility and the dynamics of the ankle joint. Studies confirm the positive effect of orthoses with adjustable functional elements in patients with paralysis of these muscle groups. It is of great advantage if the resistances of the two functional elements can be set separately from one another in the two directions of movement, dorsiflexion and plantar flexion.

Prognosis 
The severity of symptoms varies widely even for the same type of CMT. Cases of monozygotic twins with varying levels of disease severity have been reported, showing that identical genotypes are associated with different levels of severity (see penetrance). Some patients are able to live a normal life and are almost or entirely asymptomatic. A 2007 review stated that, "life expectancy is not known to be altered in the majority of cases."

History 

The disease is named after those who classically described it: the Frenchman Jean-Martin Charcot (1825–1893), his pupil Pierre Marie (1853–1940), and the Briton Howard Henry Tooth (1856–1925).

See also 
 Charcot–Marie–Tooth disease classifications
 Palmoplantar keratoderma and spastic paraplegia
 Hereditary motor and sensory neuropathies
 Hereditary motor neuropathies
 Low copy repeats
 Christina's World

References

External links 

 

Peripheral nervous system disorders
Cytoskeletal defects
Syndromes affecting the nervous system